Sooriyur  is a village in Tiruchirappalli taluk of Tiruchirappalli district in Tamil Nadu, India.

Demographics 

As per the 2001 census, Sooriyur had a population of 2,400 with 1,188 males and 1,212 females. The sex ratio was 1020 and the literacy rate, 57.32.

Educational Institutions 
Anna University Tiruchirappalli and IIM Trichy are present in Sooriyur, Tiruchirappalli-Pudukkottai National Highway 336

References 

 

Villages in Tiruchirappalli district